Orang Kanaq language is one of the Aboriginal Malay languages, grouped under the Austronesian language family. It is spoken by the Orang Kanaq, one of the 19 Orang Asli groups in Peninsular Malaysia.

A variant of Malay, Orang Kanaq is distinct from the dialects spoken by ethnic Malays living near them. All members of the Orang Kanaq tribe understand the language; however, its lexicon has been largely influenced by the Malay language.

See also
Orang Asli
Austronesian Languages
Malay Languages
Aboriginal Malay languages
List of endangered languages in Asia

References

Further reading
bin Abdul, Omar, 1978. The Orang Kanaq of southeastern Johor: a preliminary ethnography (No. 7). Social Anthropology Section, School of Comparative Social Sciences, Universiti Sains Malaysia.
bin Abdul, Omar. 1985. "The Diversified Economy of the Orang Kanaq of Southeastern Johor, Malaysia." Contributions to Southeast Asian Ethnography 4: 31–74.

Languages of Malaysia
Endangered Austronesian languages

Malayic languages